William Richard "Bull" Irvine (2 December 1898 – 26 April 1952) was a New Zealand rugby union player. He played 41 matches for the All Blacks including five internationals, scoring seven tries in all.

Irvine died in Whangarei on 26 April 1952, and he was buried in Kamo Cemetery.

References

1898 births
1952 deaths
Rugby union players from Auckland
New Zealand rugby union players
New Zealand international rugby union players
Wairarapa rugby union players
Hawke's Bay rugby union players
Rugby union hookers